Peacefrog may refer to:
 Peacefrog Records, a British recording company
 "Peace Frog", a 1970 song by The Doors
 Peace Frogs, an branded apparel company in Gloucester, Virginia, U.S.